Christian Voigt (born 20 December 1943) is a German hurdler. He competed in the men's 110 metres hurdles at the 1964 Summer Olympics.

References

1943 births
Living people
Athletes (track and field) at the 1964 Summer Olympics
German male hurdlers
Olympic athletes of the United Team of Germany
Place of birth missing (living people)